Ten Wheel Drive was an American rock band which existed from 1968 to 1974.

History
In 1968, after the final break-up of the all-female rock band Goldie & The Gingerbreads,
Genya Ravan was looking for a new band, as were two New Jersey musicians and songwriters, Michael Zager and Aram Schefrin. Acquainted by their managers, the three musicians would become the nucleus of the new band.

More musicians had to be found for the rhythm and brass sections. With the exception of Ravan, only people who were able to read sheet music were hired. In 1969 the band started to perform regularly and attract positive reviews.

At the same time, Polydor Records was forming an American division. Its new President, Jerry Schoenbaum, closed a deal with Ten Wheel Drive, and together with producer Walter Raim the band released its first album, Construction #1.

Ten Wheel Drive's first big concert appearance was in 1969 at the Fillmore East in New York City. Apart from the band's intense musical presence, Ravan caused some excitement when she took off her see-through jacket and continued the performance half-naked with painted breasts and shoulders.

In the summer of the same year, Ten Wheel Drive appeared at the Atlanta Pop Festival. On this occasion Ravan met Janis Joplin (to whom she had often been previously compared), for the second time, after first meeting at Steve Paul's The Scene, when Joplin sat in with the band.

In 1970, Ten Wheel Drive released their second album, Brief Replies, with producer Guy Draper. By then many of the brass musicians had also been replaced. Reviewing in Christgau's Record Guide: Rock Albums of the Seventies (1981), Robert Christgau wrote: "This beats Lighthouse (arrghh) and Blood, Sweat & Tears (urrp), but with their intricate charts and printed music Michael Zager and Aram Schefrin make like they paid their dues in a conservatory. Which I'm sure they did. The intensity of Janis surrogate Ravan is a little less harsh and wearying on the follow-up, though. And it all comes together on 'Morning Much Better,' about when rather than how to make love."

1971 saw Ten Wheel Drive performing at Carnegie Hall. The project consisted of a rock opera based on the Battle of the Little Big Horn and the history of the Native North American peoples. The American Symphony Orchestra and a choir participated in the project.

Also in 1971, the band's third album Peculiar Friends appeared, for the first time produced by Schefrin and Zager. Ravan decided to leave the band and start her solo career at this time. She was replaced by Annie Sutton of The Rascals. Schefrin and Zager later contributed to Ravan’s first solo album.

Ten Wheel Drive left Polydor and their fourth and final album, Ten Wheel Drive (1974), was released by Capitol Records. The album includes one song which had earlier been composed by Ravan with Schefrin and Zager, "Why Am I So Easy to Leave". With this record the already loose cooperation between the band's musicians ended. Michael Zager had big disco hit "Let's all Chant" in 1978.

Line-up

Discography

Albums

Compilations
 1995 The Best of Ten Wheel Drive

Singles

See also
Genya Ravan

R&B 
Funk 
Jazz 
Jazz rock

References

External links
[ Ten Wheel Drive entry at allmusic.com]
Michael Zager biography
Ten Wheel Drive on Genya Ravan's website
Podcast - The Ten Wheel Drive Chronicles (rss file) 
Horn Rock Heaven blog
Horn Rock Heaven at MySpace

American rock music groups
Musical groups established in 1968
Musical groups disestablished in 1974